Damir Stojak (born 22 May 1975) is a Serbian former professional footballer who played as a striker.

Club career
After his promising performances at Vojvodina, Stojak moved abroad and signed with Italian side Napoli in early 1998. He made 13 appearances and scored twice in the remainder of the 1997–98 Serie A, as the club finished bottom of the table.

International career
Stojak was capped for FR Yugoslavia at under-21 level.

References

External links
 
 

Association football forwards
Belgian Pro League players
Bundesliga players
C.S. Visé players
Eintracht Frankfurt players
Expatriate footballers in Belgium
Expatriate footballers in Germany
Expatriate footballers in Italy
First League of Serbia and Montenegro players
FK Kabel players
FK Vojvodina players
OFK Bečej 1918 players
S.C. Eendracht Aalst players
Serbia and Montenegro expatriate footballers
Serbia and Montenegro expatriate sportspeople in Belgium
Serbia and Montenegro expatriate sportspeople in Germany
Serbia and Montenegro expatriate sportspeople in Italy
Serbia and Montenegro footballers
Serbia and Montenegro under-21 international footballers
Serbian footballers
Serie A players
Footballers from Novi Sad
S.S.C. Napoli players
1975 births
Living people